Rødøy Church is a parish church of the Church of Norway in Rødøy Municipality in Nordland county, Norway. It is located on the island of Rødøya. It is one of the churches in the Rødøy parish which is part of the Nord-Helgeland prosti (deanery) in the Diocese of Sør-Hålogaland. The white, wooden church was built in an octagonal style in 1885 using plans drawn up by the architect Andreas Grenstad. The church seats about 700 people.

History
The earliest existing historical records of the church date back to the year 1432, but the church was not built that year. The first church was likely a stave church that was built in the 14th century. During the 17th century, records show that the church was in need of replacing one of the large stave posts. In 1725, the old medieval building was torn down and a new church was built on the same site. The new building was a small wooden church with a low roof line and no tower. It had a cruciform design and later a tower was constructed on the roof.

In 1814, this church served as an election church. Together with more than 300 other parish churches across Norway, it was a polling station for elections to the 1814 Norwegian Constituent Assembly which wrote the Constitution of Norway. This was Norway's first national elections. Each church parish was a constituency that elected people called "electors" who later met together in each county to elect the representatives for the assembly that was to meet in Eidsvoll later that year.

This new church was built in an octagonal design. After construction was complete, the old church was torn down. The church had a fire in 2009 after a lightning strike.

See also
List of churches in Sør-Hålogaland

References

Rødøy
Churches in Nordland
Octagonal churches in Norway
Wooden churches in Norway
19th-century Church of Norway church buildings
Churches completed in 1885
14th-century establishments in Norway
Norwegian election church